Kintampo waterfalls is one of Ghana' highest waterfalls located in Bono East. It was formerly known as Sanders Falls during the colonial days. It is just after the Falls Rest Stop when moving Northwards, on the right side of the road.

History 
The waterfalls was designated in 1992 as a tourist site, after it was discovered in the 18th century.

Incidents 
On 20 March 2017, 28 people were killed and others injured after a large tree fell on them at the waterfalls, following a storm. Reportedly, the police declared that 22 persons were rescued. After the incident, the Ghanaian Ministry of Tourism, Arts and Culture closed the falls, to undertake a security and safety assessment, as well as reconstruction. Before reopening to the public in 2019, a canopy walkway was constructed.

Description 
The water flows from the Pumpum River, a tributary of the Black Volta which takes its source from Pumpumatifi. The falls has three stages. The initial two stages can be reached easily because the way is levelled. The third stage has about 173 stairs down and about 151 stairs up. The water flows from a distance of about 25 metres.

Facilities 
The waterfalls currently has car park, stairs, receptive center and a canopy walkway.

Gallery

References

External links
 

Bono East Region
Waterfalls of Ghana